The Ministry of Roads and Highways (MRH) is an agency of the Government of Ghana responsible for formulating policies, coordinating sector performance, monitoring and evaluating road infrastructure, development, financing, road construction and road maintenance in Ghana.

Structure
MRH is made up of 8 Directorates and 5 Units. In addition, the Ghana Road Fund Secretariat and the Koforidua Training Center (KTC) are under the Ministry. 2 Departments and 1 Authority under the Ministry.

The Department of Feeder Roads is responsible for the road construction and road maintenance of feeder roads in Ghana, and the Department of Urban Roads is responsible for the road construction and road maintenance of urban roads in Ghana.  Ghana Highways Authority;  in charge of the trunk roads in Ghana.

 Department of Urban Roads
 Department of Feeder Roads
 Ghana Road Fund Secretariat;  in charge of the management of the day-to-day activities of the Road Fund under the direction of the secretary of the Road Fund Board.

Vision
The vision of the Ministry of Roads and Highways is to provide and maintain an integrated, cost-effective, safe and sustainable road transport network responsive to the needs of users, supporting growth and poverty reduction.

Mission
The mission of the ministry is to formulate the requisite policies, monitor and evaluate programmes and projects to ensure the provision of affordable, integrated, safe, responsive and sustainable road transport network that will meet the economic, social and environmental needs as well as national and international standards.

References

External links
 Ministry of Roads and Highways (MRT)
 twitter
 YouTube
Road transport in Ghana
Roads and Highways